The Central and Western Heritage Trail is a Heritage Trail in Hong Kong, that was designed by the Antiquities and Monuments Office of the Leisure and Cultural Services Department.

It covers the Central and Western District of Hong Kong and consists of 3 parts:
 The Central Route (3 sections)
 The Sheung Wan Route (2 sections)
 The Western District and the Peak Route (2 sections)

The Central Route

Section A

Section B

Section C

The Sheung Wan Route

Section B

Section A

The Western District and the Peak Route
Western District comprises three small districts namely Sai Ying Pun, Shek Tong Tsui and Kennedy Town.

Section A

Section B

See also

References

External links

 The Central Route
 The Sheung Wan Route
 The Western District and the Peak Route

Heritage conservation in Hong Kong
Monuments and memorials in Hong Kong
Central and Western District, Hong Kong
Heritage trails